Rosser Ridge is a rock ridge, 4 nautical miles (7 km) long, marking the north limit of the Cordiner Peaks, Pensacola Mountains. Mapped by United States Geological Survey (USGS) from surveys and U.S. Navy air photos, 1956–66. Named by Advisory Committee on Antarctic Names (US-ACAN) for Earl W. Rosser, topographic engineer in the Pensacola Mountains, 1965–66.
 

Ridges of Queen Elizabeth Land